Lasionycta fergusoni is a moth of the family Noctuidae. It is found from the southern Washington Cascades through British Columbia and Alberta to southern Yukon.

It is found in subalpine forests and is nocturnal.

The wingspan is 32–36 mm for males and 32–37 mm for females. Adults are on wing from late June to mid-August.

External links
A Revision of Lasionycta Aurivillius (Lepidoptera, Noctuidae) for North America and notes on Eurasian species, with descriptions of 17 new species, 6 new subspecies, a new genus, and two new species of Tricholita Grote

Lasionycta
Moths described in 2009